Betana wetland or Betana Simar is located in Belbari Municipality of Morang district of Nepal. It lies about 15 km East of Itahari. Geographically, the wetland lies at an altitude of about 123 m. The lake has an area of about 5.5 ha. The forest area is about 175 ha and it is a part of Charkose Jhadi.

The wetland houses endangered plants and animals such as tortoise, fishes, birds, and indigenous flowers. About 49 species of birds have been reported in the area. The major portion of the forests consists of saal and khair-sisoo trees. The wetland region is home to a variety of birds species including migratory birds.

To attract tourists, a zoo has been constructed inside the area along with some other infrastructures.

Gallery

References

Parks in Nepal
Morang District